Chiesa di Sant'Andrea (Serravalle) is a church located in Serravalle, San Marino. It was built in 1824 over the ancient walls of the former city. It belongs to the Roman Catholic Diocese of San Marino-Montefeltro. It was built in 1824. The church was dedicated to St. Andrew and the Virgin Mary.  

Roman Catholic churches in San Marino
Roman Catholic churches completed in 1824
19th-century Roman Catholic church buildings in Italy